Mario Ezcurdia Camacho (October 1, 1925 in Mexico City – October 8, 1998) was a Mexican journalist, novelist and essayist.

Biography
He was a member of the Institutional Revolutionary Party, where he founded and directed the theoretical group Línea (1972–1975).
He started in journalism at age 16 in the year of 1943, as an assistant editorial office in the journal Hoy Today .
During his tenure as head of press of the Office of the President of the Republic (Mexico) during the regime of Adolfo Lopez Mateos (1958–1964), his performance both at home and abroad was so bright that the organizers of the tour to South Africa of General Charles de Gaulle visited Mexico especially to ask Ezcurdia guidance and training.

Journalistic career 

 Editor-in-chief at Así (1948);
 Stage director (1949);
 Editor at El Popular (1950–1952), Impacto (1953–1955) and Ovaciones (1953–1955) Newspapers;
 Founding director of the magazine Al Día (1955–1958);
 Chief of press of the Presidency of the Republic during the regime of Adolfo López Mateos (1958–1964);
 Author of the column «Las cuentas claras», in El Universal, under the pseudonym of José C. Álvarez and with his own signature (1961–1962 and 1973–1974);
 Column Author «De la política», at El Día (1969–1972 and 1977–1982);
 Commentator and producer of journalistic programs on Channel 13 television (1974–1976);
 Article Writer (1976–1978) and general director of the newspaper El Nacional (1982–1989), and
 Author of the novel El gran juego (1967), of the chronicle Operación Europa and of the essays Análisis teórico del PRI, La prioridad es el hombre (1981) y Miguel de la Madrid, el hombre, el candidato (1982); gathered a selection of his articles in  De la política.

Awards and decorations

 Commander of the Great Cross of Merit of Germany (  Großes Verdienstkreuz )
 Grand Officer of the Order of the Flag of Yugoslavia
 Officer Legion of Honor of France
 Knight Order of Orange-Nassau NetherlandsWayback Machine
 National Journalism Award 1980 and 1982. Oficial Page of Mexican National journalism award Premio Nacional de Periodismo (México)

References

Other sources and references
 Humberto Musacchio: Diccionario Enclopédico de México Ilustrado, Editorial Andrés León.
 Referencias a extractos bibliográficos del libro El Gran Juego, de Mario Ezcurdia Camacho, B. Costa-Amic, 1967

External links 
 Audio de la última colaboración de Mario Ezcurdia en Radio Fórmula, on SoundCloud

1925 births
1998 deaths
Mexican political journalists
Mexican columnists
Commanders of the Order of Orange-Nassau
Commanders Crosses of the Order of Merit of the Federal Republic of Germany